The Osceola and St. Croix Valley Railway  is a heritage railroad in Osceola, Wisconsin owned and operated by the Minnesota Transportation Museum. It operates on former Minneapolis, St. Paul and Sault Ste. Marie Railroad ("Soo Line") trackage now owned by the Canadian National Railway.

History and operations 
The original Museum railway operated out of Stillwater, Minnesota. A very popular venue, urban crowding caused the railway to seek other areas for service. Invited to operate out of Osceola, Wisconsin, the railway moved in 1992, undergoing a name change to Osceola and St. Croix Valley Railway and quickly became both a tourist venue for the town, and a means to convey historic presentations to the public.

The line itself has operating rights from Withrow, Minnesota up to Dresser, Wisconsin. Due to climate conditions, the line does not operate in winter.

Under successive railroad ownership of the rail line "right-of-way" itself, the line has continued its mission of historic presentation of the great days of railroading. Operations are currently based in the historic 1916 Soo Line depot, owned by the Osceola Historic Society and leased to the Minnesota Transportation Museum for its rail operations.

The line follows the original route of the Soo Line, running down the bluffs of the St. Croix River, and crossing into Minnesota on the 1887 iron bridge at Cedar Bend, then on to Marine on St. Croix through William O'Brien State Park. At O'Brien State Park, passengers are given a presentation of "reversing the train", as personnel go through the steps of running the engine across switches and a siding, with staff describing what's going on, why things happen in that order, and the importance of safety.

Since most passengers have never seen a railroad up close, this allows train staff the moments to present the history of the line and railroading in general. A great deal of time is covering the various safety aspects of railroading, particularly addressing children of the issues of rail safety. The Museum is a strong supporter of rail safety programs in schools at events across the Midwest.

The railway operates every weekend May through October. On alternating weekends it operates the Osceola and St. Croix Dinner Train. 

Meals (both brunch and dinner) are served to dining car passengers "old school" and "first class", by uniformed staff, in a "living history" presentation of what travel by rail was like at the height of rail travel in the U.S., the 1920s‒50s.

Equipment 

The railroad uses historic diesel locomotives from its fleet of Electro-Motive Diesel (EMD) locomotives. It uses a variety of passenger cars for historic presentation and tourist runs throughout the operational season. The railroad runs coach trains every weekend in May through October to Marine on St. Croix (Saturdays and Sundays) and to Dresser (on Saturday).

On specific weekends, it operates first-class brunch and dinner trains in Great Northern Railway dining cars, one of which is an open-platform observation car. Another Great Northern lounge/parlor car is expected to be added to the dinner train fleet in the future due to the dinner train's popular demand. The dinner train also runs on special occasions for private parties such as anniversaries, receptions, weddings, and corporate charters. Each run is oriented towards showing how passengers in the great days of rail travel would be encouraged to take specific railways based on the dining options. At various times, information is presented on the immigrant trains, and how each railroad opened up the lands of the west to settlement.

The emphasis of the operation is on the history of the railroads it represents, with information presented in an entertaining format, either during regular scheduled runs or during the Brunch & Dinner Train dates. Each operational coach represents the roads that operated in the Midwest and passengers are encouraged to ask questions about both the history of each and on how railroads assisted in the development of the region.

All operational equipment is serviced at MTM's Jackson Street Roundhouse, a functional railway roundhouse constructed in 1907. The Museum has its headquarters and maintenance base co-located at JSR, which is open to the public for railroad history. Every fall, 2–3 locomotives and up to 5 cars are ferried to St. Paul for annual servicing before returning to Osceola in late spring. Over winter, the maintenance shop demonstrate the servicing and repairs, being one of the few such facilities open to the public.

Locomotives 
These are the locomotives that are active or in restoration for service on the Osceola and St. Croix Valley Railway:

Passenger cars

See also 
 List of heritage railroads in the United States

References 

Information used in this article is provided by Minnesota Transportation Museum, St. Paul, MN and based entirely on material in MTM archives or equipment inventories of the operating division of the Osceola and St. Croix Valley Railway. Photos depict actual equipment in appropriate livery for the Railway.

External links 

 

Heritage railroads in Wisconsin
Tourist attractions in Polk County, Wisconsin